Elasmias kitaiwojimanum is a species of tropical tree-living, air-breathing, land snails, arboreal pulmonate gastropod mollusks in the family Achatinellidae. This species is endemic to Japan.

References

kitaiwojimanum
Taxonomy articles created by Polbot
Endemic fauna of Japan